Karakoca can refer to:

 Karakoca, Çan
 Karakoca, Karacabey